IASA may refer to:

 The Iranian American Sport & Culture Association, a Los Angeles-based sports diplomacy nonprofit organization
The IETF Administrative Support Activity, an activity housed within the Internet Society (ISOC)
 The Improving America's Schools Act of 1994
 The International Association of Sound and Audiovisual Archives
 The International Aviation Safety Assessment Program of the US FAA
 The Irish Amateur Swimming Association
 The Israel Arts and Science Academy, Jerusalem, Israel
 Institución Atlética Sud América, football club from Montevideo in Uruguay